The Universal Hint System, better known by the acronym UHS, is a form of strategy guide used for video games, created by Jason Strautmann in 1988. The system is designed to provide hints for solving specific parts of games without including premature spoilers. The strategy guides are primarily distributed in a UHS file format, readable using a UHS reader program.

Readers 
Since the system's creation, UHS readers have been made available for various platforms, including DOS, Apple Macintosh and Microsoft Windows. The current versions of the official readers are proprietary software products. An official Internet website, UHSWeb went online in 1998, allowing access to UHS guides via web browsers, including text-based web browsers such as Lynx.

In 2006, a platform-independent open source reader written in Java, OpenUHS, began development. As of 2008, it fully supports all hint formats.

As of March 2022, the Nice Game Hints website can be used as a UHS reader. The hint file is uploaded and can then be read in the browser.

Reception
Chuck Miller of Computer Gaming World in 1993 called UHS "a nifty gaming utility that I wish would receive greater, perhaps even universal, support in the gaming community", stating "I heartily recommend the Universal Hint System as an adventurer's resource par excellence".

Current status 
The latest additions to UHS database are hints from year 2015 about Blackwell (series).  In March 2021 Meghann O'Neill wrote a Gamasutra article about low-spoiler hints for adventure games. In the article, she briefly mentions UHS and states that it is not active anymore.

Nice Game Hints 
There is a spiritual successor for UHS available called Nice Game Hints. It contains more modern games but lacks older titles found in UHS. Nice Game Hints (NGH) is purely web-based and does not provide offline reader capability as UHS did.

References

External links 

http://www.uhs-hints.com/
https://www.nicegamehints.com/

Video game culture